James Briggs is the name of:
 James Briggs (musician) (born 1978), American keyboardist and saxophonist
 James E. Briggs (1906–1979), United States Air Force general
 James Frankland Briggs (1827–1905), United States Representative from New Hampshire
 Jimmy Briggs (1937–2011), Scottish footballer
 Jimmy Briggs (politician) (born 1868), Australian-born South African trade unionist and Senator
 Jamie Briggs (born 1977), Australian politician